JSC "Donavia", also known as Aeroflot-Don between 2000–2009, was an Aeroflot subsidiary airline based in Rostov-on-Don, Russia. Its main bases were Rostov-on-Don Airport and Mineralnye Vody Airport after the Kavminvodyavia bankruptcy. In the spring of 2016, its operations were merged into sister company Rossiya.

History 

The airline was established on 15 June 1925 as a squadron under the Soviet airline Aeroflot, following the dissolution of the Soviet Union in 1991, it was rebranded as Don Airlines ("Donavia") in 1993. It absorbed the Rostov assets of Aeroflot, and was one of many such "Babyflots" to emerge in the early 1990s. However, the airline was purchased by Aeroflot in 2000 and began to operate as Aeroflot-Don on 13 April 2000. It operated scheduled domestic and international passenger flights as well as passenger and cargo charters, mostly to the Middle East and within Russia. On 25 September 2009, the airline reverted to the Donavia brand name.

Destinations
Donavia served the following destinations before its merger with Rossiya:

Asia

Central Asia

Dushanbe – Dushanbe International Airport
Khujand – Khujand Airport

Tashkent – Tashkent International Airport

Western Asia

Yerevan – Zvartnots International Airport

Tel Aviv – Ben Gurion International Airport

Antalya – Antalya Airport
Istanbul – Istanbul Atatürk Airport

Europe

Krasnodar – Krasnodar International Airport
Mineralnye Vody – Mineralnye Vody Airport Focus City
Moscow Focus City
Moscow Domodedovo Airport 
Vnukovo International Airport 
Novosibirsk – Tolmachevo Airport
Rostov-on-Don – Rostov-on-Don Airport Hub
Saint Petersburg – Pulkovo Airport
Sochi – Sochi International Airport Focus City
Stavropol – Stavropol Shpakovskoye Airport
Volgograd – Volgograd International Airport
Yekaterinburg – Koltsovo Airport
 /  
Simferopol – Simferopol International Airport

The political status of Crimea is the subject of a political and territorial dispute between Russia and Ukraine.

Fleet 
In April 2016, the entire Donavia fleet was reassigned to Rossiya.

References

External links 

  

Defunct airlines of Russia
Russian companies established in 1992
2016 disestablishments in Russia
Airlines established in 1992
Airlines disestablished in 2016
Former Aeroflot divisions
Former SkyTeam affiliate members
Companies based in Rostov-on-Don